Fulford is a village and civil parish about  north east of Stone, in the Stafford district, in the county of Staffordshire, England. The parish includes the settlements of Crossgate, Leadendale, Meir Heath, Mossgate, Rough Close, Saverley Green, Stallington, Townend and part of Blythe Bridge. In 2011 the built-up area had a population of 650 and the parish had 5,931. The village is on one of the tributaries of the River Blythe. The parish is one of the largest in the Stafford district. The parish touches Forsbrook, Hilderstone, Stone Rural, Barlaston and Draycott in the Moors.

Features 
Fulford has a church dedicated to St Nicholas, which is Grade II listed and was built in the Gothic style in 1825 by C. H. Winks, a primary school and village hall on Fulford Road and a pub called the Shoulder of Mutton, on Meadow Lane. There are 9 listed buildings in Fulford, all Grade II listed.

History 
The name "Fulford" means "the dirty ford". Fulford was recorded in the Domesday Book as Fuleford. The village is one of the possible sources of the surname Fulford.

Civil parish 

Formerly a township and chapelry, Fulford became a civil parish on 1 April 1897. The parish was created from part of Stone Rural parish, which itself had been split from Stone parish in 1894.

References

External links 

 Village website
 Fulford Parish Council

Villages in Staffordshire
Civil parishes in Staffordshire
Borough of Stafford